Highwire may refer to:

 Highwire (protein)
 "Highwire" (song), by the Rolling Stones (1991)
 "Highwire", a song by Gin Blossoms on the 1996 album Congratulations I'm Sorry

See also
 HighWire Press
 Tightrope walking
 High Wire (disambiguation)